Leeds South was a parliamentary constituency in the city of Leeds, West Yorkshire, which returned one Member of Parliament (MP) to the House of Commons of the Parliament of the United Kingdom from 1885 until it was abolished for the 1983 general election. It was then largely replaced by the new Morley and Leeds South constituency.

It was the seat of the former Leader of the Labour Party, the late Hugh Gaitskell, and the former Home Secretary Merlyn Rees.

Boundaries
1885–1918: The Municipal Borough of Leeds wards of East Hunslet, South, and West Hunslet, and part of Bramley ward.

1918–1950: The County Borough of Leeds wards of Holbeck and West Hunslet, and part of New Wortley ward.

1950–1955: The County Borough of Leeds wards of Beeston, Holbeck South, Hunslet Carr and Middleton, and West Hunslet.

1955–1974: The County Borough of Leeds wards of Beeston, Holbeck, Hunslet Carr, and Middleton.

1974–1983: The County Borough of Leeds wards of Beeston, East Hunslet, Holbeck, Middleton, and West Hunslet.

History
The constituency was created in 1885 by the Redistribution of Seats Act 1885, and was first used in the general election of that year.  Leeds had previously been represented by two MPs (1832–1868) and three MPs (1868–1885). From 1885 it was represented by five single-member constituencies: Leeds Central, Leeds East, Leeds North, Leeds South and Leeds West.  The constituencies of Morley, Otley and Pudsey were also created in 1885.

The constituency was abolished for the 1983 general election.  It was then largely replaced by the new Morley and Leeds South constituency.  After the 1983 general election Leeds was represented by the constituencies of Leeds Central, Leeds East, Leeds North East, Leeds North West, Leeds West and Morley and Leeds South.  There were also constituencies of Elmet (created 1983) and Pudsey.

Members of Parliament

Elections

Elections in the 1880s 

Playfair was appointed Vice-President of the Committee of the Council on Education, requiring a by-election.

Elections in the 1890s 

 Caused by Playfair's elevation to the peerage.

Elections in the 1900s

Elections in the 1910s 

General Election 1914–15:

Another General Election was required to take place before the end of 1915. The political parties had been making preparations for an election to take place and by the July 1914, the following candidates had been selected; 
Liberal: William Middlebrook
Unionist: 
Labour: 

* Brook was supported by the three local branches of National Association of Discharged Sailors and Soldiers, National Federation of Discharged and Demobilized Sailors and Soldiers and Comrades of the Great War.

Elections in the 1920s

Elections in the 1930s

General Election 1939–40:

Another General Election was required to take place before the end of 1940. The political parties had been making preparations for an election to take place and by the Autumn of 1939, the following candidates had been selected; 
Labour: Hugh Gaitskell
Conservative: Donald Kaberry
Liberal: J. Alun Williams
British Union: John Angus Macnab

Election in the 1940s

Elections in the 1950s

Elections in the 1960s

Election in the 1970s

References

Parliamentary constituencies in Yorkshire and the Humber (historic)
Constituencies of the Parliament of the United Kingdom established in 1885
Constituencies of the Parliament of the United Kingdom disestablished in 1983
Politics of Leeds